Anatoli Viktorovich Ivanov (born 20 March 1972) is a retired Russian professional football player.

Club career
He played nine seasons in the Russian Football National League for 5 different teams.

References

1972 births
Sportspeople from Pskov
Living people
Russian footballers
Association football goalkeepers
FC Lada-Tolyatti players
FC Khimki players
FC Dynamo Stavropol players
FC Metallurg Lipetsk players
FC Zvezda Irkutsk players
FC Petrotrest players
FC Dynamo Saint Petersburg players